Georgi Pachedzhiev (1 March 1916 – 12 April 2005) was a Bulgarian football manager who coached Bulgaria at the 1962 FIFA World Cup, the first ever time that Bulgaria did reach the finals. As a footballer, he won the most trophies while playing for Levski Sofia, and was the top scorer in the A Group in 1939 with fourteen goals. He died in April 2005.

Honours
Player
Sportclub Sofia
 Bulgarian A PFG: 1935

Levski Sofia
 Bulgarian A PFG: 1947, 1949
 Bulgarian Cup: 1947, 1949

OSK AS-23
 Bulgarian Cup: 1941

Slavia Sofia
 Bulgarian Cup: 1952

Individual
 Bulgarian A PFG top goalscorer: 1939 (14 goals)

Coach
Levski Sofia
 Bulgarian Cup: 1956, 1957, 1959

AC Omonia
 Cypriot First Division: 1966

References

External links
Profile at eu-football.info

1916 births
2005 deaths
Bulgarian footballers
Bulgaria international footballers
First Professional Football League (Bulgaria) players
PFC Levski Sofia players
Association football forwards
Bulgarian football managers
PFC Levski Sofia managers
AC Omonia managers
Expatriate football managers in Cyprus
Bulgarian expatriate sportspeople in Cyprus
Bulgaria national football team managers
1962 FIFA World Cup managers
Bulgarian expatriate football managers
Footballers from Sofia